Treasury of Bahman Mirza, also called Bahman Mirza Mausoleum is a tomb which was built in honour of the Prince Bahman Mirza Qajar from Qajar dynasty of Iran who was a prominent politician in the 19th century.

Prince Bahman Mirza
Bahman Mirza Qajar was born on October 11, 1811 in Tehran. He was the son of the Persian Crown Prince Abbas Mirza and princess Assiya Khanom. In 1831-1834 he was the governor of Ardebil. In 1848, Bahman Mirza escaped from Iran to Tiflis under a threat of being arrested. With the permission of the Russian Tsar, he settled in Shusha town on October 4, 1851 with his harem consisting of 7 wives and 19 children. In Shusha, Bahman Mirza built a palace complex which included a two-story house with 15-16 rooms, rounded balconies, large oval hall, garden. In the big graden there were several houses consisting of 5-6 rooms for each of his wives and many more buildings including horse barns, storages, kitchens, etc. There was also a school for his children, mosque and a bath house. In 1905, the palace of Bahman Mirza was burned by Armenians. The palace was later reconstructed by son Gulam Shah Mirza Qajar.

The treasury mausoleum
The tomb mausoleum is located in the city of Shusha in the contested Nagorno-Karabakh region. It was built by orders of Bahman Mirza himself while he was alive. The mausoleum consisted of three big rooms. The first largest room at the entrance served as foyer, second one served as a library and third for remains of Bahman Mirza Qajar. After the capture of Shusha by Armenian troops on May 8, 1992, the state of the Bahman Mirza Treasury remains unknown.

See also
 Shusha State Historical and Architectural Reserve
 Vagif Mausoleum
 Nizami Mausoleum
 Caravanserai of Agha Gahraman Mirsiyab
 Yukhari Govhar Agha Mosque
 Ashaghi Govhar Agha Mosque
 Saatli Mosque

References

Buildings and structures completed in the 19th century
Monuments and memorials in Shusha
Monuments and memorials in Azerbaijan
Architecture in Azerbaijan
Bahman Mirza
Monuments and memorials built in the Soviet Union
Tourist attractions in Azerbaijan
Bahman Mirza